Crows Landing is a census-designated place (CDP) in Stanislaus County, California. Crows Landing is about
 southwest of Modesto. The 2020 United States census reported Crows Landing's population was 322.

History
Crows Landing was founded on the San Joaquin River, as a river landing or crossing, by John Crow, who was born in Missouri in 1830 and died in California in 1917; John Crow's father, Walter Crow, had left Missouri to mine gold in California in 1849. John Crow emigrated from Missouri to California in a covered wagon
with his wife Margaret Malinda Bodenhamer, born in 1837 in Quincy, Illinois and died in California in 1918. The Crows had 12 children, but not all survived to adulthood. 

In 1887, Crows Landing was relocated to its present site, 4 miles west of its original location, to be served by the Southern Pacific Railroad.

Members of the Crow family still live at Crows Landing and operate a walnut farm. 

The small airport at Crows Landing, west of town, was formerly used as an auxiliary landing site for training World War II pilots from Naval Air Station Alameda, and later for NASA's experimental aircraft from the Ames Research Center in Mountain View. In 2000, control of the airfield was transferred to Stanislaus County. The airfield has been closed since 2011 and is now used for testing cars, trucks, aircraft, and for storage.

Geography
According to the United States Census Bureau, the CDP covers an area of 3.2 square miles (8.2 km2), all of it land.

Demographics

The 2010 United States Census reported that Crows Landing had a population of 355. The racial makeup of Crows Landing was 162 (45.6%) White, 5 (1.4%) African American, 1 (0.3%) Native American, 0 (0.0%) Asian, 0 (0.0%) Pacific Islander, 182 (51.3%) from other races, and 5 (1.4%) from two or more races. Hispanic or Latino of any race were 248 persons (69.9%).

The Census reported that 355 people (100% of the population) lived in households, 0 (0%) lived in non-institutionalized group quarters, and 0 (0%) were institutionalized.

There were 121 households, out of which 44 (36.4%) had children under the age of 18 living in them, 66 (54.5%) were opposite-sex married couples living together, 9 (7.4%) had a female householder with no husband present, 8 (6.6%) had a male householder with no wife present.  There were 3 (2.5%) unmarried opposite-sex partnerships, and 0 (0%) same-sex married couples or partnerships. 36 households (29.8%) were made up of individuals, and 19 (15.7%) had someone living alone who was 65 years of age or older. The average household size was 2.93.  There were 83 families (68.6% of all households); the average family size was 3.73.

The population was spread out, with 99 people (27.9%) under the age of 18, 34 people (9.6%) aged 18 to 24, 85 people (23.9%) aged 25 to 44, 81 people (22.8%) aged 45 to 64, and 56 people (15.8%) who were 65 years of age or older.  The median age was 37.7 years. For every 100 females, there were 107.6 males.  For every 100 females age 18 and over, there were 106.5 males.

The homeowner vacancy rate was 2.5%; the rental vacancy rate was 6.4%.  214 people (60.3% of the population) lived in owner-occupied housing units and 141 people (39.7%) lived in rental housing units.

References

Census-designated places in Stanislaus County, California
Census-designated places in California